

People
Speirs is a surname. Notable people with the surname include:

Annie Speirs (1889–1926), British freestyle swimmer
Fraser Speirs (21st century), Glasgow-based harmonica player
Fraser Speirs (21 century) a Scottish teacher with a like for Tom Bhin bags. 
Gardner Speirs (born 1963), Scottish former footballer and manager
Jimmy Speirs (1886–1917), Scottish football player
Nicole Speirs (born 1983), domestic violence murder victim
Ronald Speirs (1920–2007), United States Army officer
Steve Speirs (born 1965), British actor
William Speirs Bruce (1867–1921), London-born Scottish polar scientist and oceanographer

Business
 Stewart Speirs Ltd [sic], the registered name from c. 1933 of the firm of Scottish plane-makers Stewart Spiers

See also
Spears (disambiguation)
Speir
Spiers